Goliath is a 2022 science fiction novel by Nigerian American writer Tochi Onyebuchi. It is his first adult science fiction novel and it was published on 25 January 2022 by Tor Books.

Background 
In an interview by NPR, Onyebuchi stated most space movies on TV mostly show white people who are on spaceship terraforming Mars and that he had the idea of the novel when he thought about what happened to the all the Black and Brown people that were never depicted. He also noted that anime like Gundam Wing and Ghost In The Shell had inspired the novel.

Reception 
The book received generally positive receptions from book reviewers and readers alike. It was a New York Times editor's choice and one of the most anticipated books of 2022. It was recommended by several media outlets including USA Today, Bustle, Buzzfeed and Polygon.

A review by the New York Times noted that the book has "an ingenious premise", another review by Publishers Weekly called the novel a "gorgeous work".  Beth Mowbray in a review for The Nerd Daily praised the novel stating that "in Goliath, Onyebuchi creates an alternate future which certainly reflects the issues of our own day and time."

References 

English-language novels
Nigerian science fiction novels
2022 American novels
American science fiction novels
African-American novels
Nigerian LGBT novels
2022 science fiction novels
Novels by Tochi Onyebuchi
2022 Nigerian novels
Dystopian novels
Tor Books books